Eupseudomorpha is a monotypic moth genus of the family Noctuidae erected by Harrison Gray Dyar Jr. in 1893. Its only species, Eupseudomorpha brillians, was first described by Berthold Neumoegen in 1880. It is found in the southwestern part of the US state of Texas.

References

Agaristinae
Monotypic moth genera